HMCS may refer to:

 His Majesty's Courts Service
 His Majesty's Canadian Ship
 His Majesty's Colonial Ship, see His Majesty's Ship
 Senior Chief Hospital Corpsman, a United States Navy rate
 Hazardous Material Control System (see Workplace Hazardous Materials Information System)
 HMC Investment Securities
 Molybdenum cofactor sulfurtransferase, an enzyme